Carl David Baker (born February 16, 1953) is the former President and CEO of the Pro Football Hall of Fame in Canton, Ohio.

He earned a Bachelor of Arts degree in English Literature and Criticism from the University of California, Irvine and his Juris Doctor from the Pepperdine University School of Law, during which time he served as the Editor-in-Chief of the Pepperdine Law Review.

One of Baker's more imposing aspects is his size – 6 feet 9 inches tall and 400 pounds. He was a power forward at UC Irvine from 1971–75 where he established the school record for career rebounds (926) that stood for 44 years until broken by Jonathan Galloway in 2019. Baker also played two seasons of professional basketball in Europe before attending law school.

Baker was a City Councilman of Irvine, California. He left his political career in 1988 after being convicted of forgery in California for attempting to embezzle $48,000 in campaign funds.

On November 8th, 1996, Baker became the fourth commissioner of the Arena Football League. He started in the league as the owner of the Anaheim Piranhas, which he left after a single season of owning the team to become league commissioner. Baker resigned as Arena Football League Commissioner at ArenaBowl XXII, on July 25, 2008, after almost twelve years as commissioner.

From 2009 to 2014, he was Managing Partner for Union Village, an integrated health care village in Henderson, Nevada.

On January 2, 2014, Baker was announced as the President of the Pro Football Hall of Fame. In his first three years of leadership at the Hall, the organization's net assets grew 161%. He was also involved in the Hall of Fame Village, a mixed-use development surrounding the Hall of Fame.

On November 28, 2017, Baker received the March of Dimes Sports Leadership Award.

On October 16, 2021, Baker announced his retirement as the president of the Pro Football Hall of Fame.

Personal life
Baker and his wife Colleen will be leaving Canton, Ohio. One of his sons is Sam Baker, who played for the Atlanta Falcons as an offensive tackle. Baker is a Christian.

References

External links
 "Q&A with AFL commissioner David Baker". Inside the AFL. June 23, 2004 interview

 [* Grand Scam in Mexico, in the shadow of The NFL Hall of Fame.
Proceso. 2019-20-10

[Grand Scam in Mexico, in the shadow of The NFL Hall of Fame]

1953 births
Living people
Basketball players from California
Arena Football League executives
Arena Football League commissioners
Mayors of Irvine, California
UC Irvine Anteaters men's basketball players
American athlete-politicians
Pepperdine University School of Law alumni
University of California, Irvine alumni
California Republicans
American men's basketball players
Power forwards (basketball)
Pro Football Hall of Fame ceo
Johnson Controls Hall of Fame Village chairman of the board and ceo